Pulgaon Assembly constituency was one of the seats in Maharashtra Legislative Assembly in India. It was made defunct after constituency map of India was redrawn in 2008. It was part of Wardha Lok Sabha seat.

Members of Assembly 
 1972 : Prabha Rao / Prabha Rau (INC)
 2004 : Ranjeet Kamble (INC)
 2009 onwards : Seat does not exist

Election Results

1972 Assembly Election
 Smt Prabha Rao (INC) : 40,499 votes    
 Motilal Shamlal Kapoor (FBL) : 12,248 votes

2004 Assembly Election
 Kamble Ranjeet Prataprao (INC) : 58,836 votes  
 Sau. Saroj Ravi Kashikar (STBP) : 38,151 votes

See also 
 Wardha District
 List of constituencies of Maharashtra Legislative Assembly

References 

Assembly constituencies of Maharashtra